Arthur Sidney Tompkins (August 26, 1865 – January 20, 1938) was a U.S. Representative from New York, and a justice of the New York Supreme Court.

Early life
Born in Middleburgh, New York, Tompkins moved with his parents to West Nyack, New York, in 1866.  He attended the public schools of Clarkstown and Nyack until 1878.  He studied law, was admitted to the bar in 1886 and commenced practice in Nyack, New York.  He was police justice of Nyack, New York, from 1887 to 1889.

Political career
Tompkins was elected chairman of the Rockland County Republican committee in 1888.  He was a member of the New York State Assembly (Rockland Co.) in 1890. He was a delegate to all Republican State conventions from 1888 to 1906, and as delegate or alternate to all Republican National Conventions from 1888 to 1900.  He was also county judge and surrogate of Rockland County 1893-1898.

Tompkins was elected as a Republican to the 56th and 57th United States Congresses, holding office from March 4, 1899, to March 3, 1903. Afterwards he resumed the practice of law in Nyack.

Judicial career
Tompkins was elected justice of the Supreme Court of New York in 1906.  He was reelected in 1920 and 1934.  He was promoted to the Appellate Division of the Supreme Court of New York in January 1930 and served until his retirement in 1936.  He died in Nyack, New York, January 20, 1938.  He was interred in Oak Hill Cemetery.

Sources

1865 births
1938 deaths
Politicians from Rockland County, New York
New York Supreme Court Justices
Republican Party members of the New York State Assembly
Republican Party members of the United States House of Representatives from New York (state)
People from Middleburgh, New York
People from West Nyack, New York
People from Nyack, New York